This is a list of cities in Tajikistan.

The largest metropolitan area in Tajikistan is that of the capital Dushanbe, with 863,400 inhabitants (2020 est.). Thirteen percent of the population of the country lives in the region of the capital.

Cities of more than 10,000 people, listed by population
The following table includes all cities larger than 10,000 people, with their names in English, and the corresponding names in Cyrillic and Perso-Arabic script. Because of transliteration difficulties, some are known by more than one spelling. The population is from the censuses of 12 January 1989, 20 January 2000 and 21 September 2010, as well as estimates for 1 January 2015 and 2020. The population figures are for the city proper, and do not include adjacent communities. In addition, the administrative division in which the city lies is named, usually a region, or an autonomous region in the case of Gorno-Badakhshan Autonomous Region (GBAR). There is also the capital district, and the Districts under Central Government Jurisdiction (Nohiyahoi tobei jumhuri, here abbreviated NTJ), which do not belong to a region, and are directly under the central government. Finally, the district in which the city lies is given.

1: Name from 1929 to 1961: Stalinabad
2: Name from 1939 to 1992: Leninabad
*Cities under central government jurisdiction
**Cities under regional jurisdiction

See also

 List of renamed cities in Tajikistan
 List of towns and villages in Tajikistan

References 

State Statistical Committee
World Gazetteer – Current population figures for Tajik cities
City Population – Historical censuses for Tajik cities

Tajikistan
 
Cities